The 2009–2010 UCI Cyclo-cross World Cup events and season-long competition took place between 4 October 2009 and 24 January 2010, and was sponsored by the Union Cycliste Internationale (UCI).

Events

See also
 2009–2010 Cyclo-cross Superprestige
 2009–2010 Cyclo-cross Gazet van Antwerpen

External links
 Official website
 UCI Archive: 09-10 Cyclo-cross World Cup - Results & Standings

World Cup
World Cup
UCI Cyclo-cross World Cup